Love, Honor and Obey is a 1920 American silent drama film. Directed by Leander de Cordova, the film stars Wilda Bennett, Claire Whitney, and Henry Harmon. It was released on September 6, 1920.

Cast list
 Wilda Bennett as Conscience Williams
 Claire Whitney as Marion Holbury
 Henry Harmon as William Williams
 Kenneth Harlan as Stuart Emmett
 George Cowl as Eben Tollman
 E. J. Radcliffe as Jack Holbury (credited as E. J. Ratcliffe)

References

External links

American silent feature films
American black-and-white films
Silent American drama films
1920 drama films
Metro Pictures films
1920s English-language films
1920 films
Films based on American novels
Films directed by Leander de Cordova
1920s American films